Mantidactylus femoralis is a species of frog in the family Mantellidae.
It is endemic to Madagascar. It is a complex of multiple species.
Its natural habitats are subtropical or tropical moist lowland forests, subtropical or tropical moist montane forests, subtropical or tropical high-altitude shrubland, rivers, and heavily degraded former forest.
It is threatened by habitat loss.

References

femoralis
Endemic frogs of Madagascar
Taxonomy articles created by Polbot
Amphibians described in 1882